Eduardo Antonio Montenegro Zúñiga (born 30 September 1998) is a Colombian footballer who currently plays as a midfielder for Envigado.

Career statistics

Club

Notes

References

1998 births
Living people
Colombian footballers
Colombian expatriate footballers
Association football midfielders
Udinese Calcio players
Watford F.C. players
Real Valladolid Promesas players
Envigado F.C. players
Segunda División B players
Categoría Primera A players
Colombian expatriate sportspeople in Italy
Expatriate footballers in Italy
Colombian expatriate sportspeople in England
Expatriate footballers in England
Colombian expatriate sportspeople in Spain
Expatriate footballers in Spain
Footballers from Barranquilla
21st-century Colombian people